Leo McKinstry (born 1962) is a British journalist, historian and author.

Life and career
Born in Belfast, Northern Ireland, McKinstry was educated at Portora Royal School, Enniskillen, and Sidney Sussex College, Cambridge, where he graduated with a degree in History in 1985, and identified himself as a Trotskyite. He writes regularly for several newspapers in the United Kingdom, including the Daily Mail, Daily Express, and The Sunday Telegraph. He often writes about issues relating to immigration and the European Union, being a strong supporter of Brexit. His books include a biography of the Victorian Prime Minister, Lord Rosebery.

In the early 1990s, McKinstry was a Labour councillor in Islington and worked as a parliamentary aide to Labour politician Harriet Harman. Losing his seat on Islington council in 1994, he was working for Labour frontbencher Doug Henderson when he announced the following year, via an article in The Spectator, that he no longer supported the party. Subsequently, he was a regular columnist in both the Daily Mail and the Daily Express.

McKinstry is married and lives in Kent and Provence.

Awards and honours
2003 British Sports Book Awards (Best Biography), Jack & Bobby
2007 British Sports Book Awards (Best Football Book), Sir Alf

Bibliography
Fit to Govern: A Former Labour Activist Asks: Can Tony Blair's Party be Trusted to Run Britain? (1996), Bantam Press, 
Boycs: The True Story (2000), Partridge Press, 
Jack and Bobby: A story of brothers in conflict (2002), HarperCollins UK, 
Rosebery: Statesman in Turmoil (2005), John Murray Publishers, 
Sir Alf: A Major Reappraisal of the Life and Times of England's Greatest Football Manager (2006), HarperCollins UK, 
Spitfire: Portrait of a Legend (2007), Hodder & Stoughton, 
Lancaster: The Second World War's Greatest Bomber (2009), Hodder & Stoughton, 
Hurricane: Victor of the Battle of Britain (2010), Hodder & Stoughton, 
Jack Hobbs: England's Greatest Cricketer (2011), Yellow Jersey Press, 
Operation Sea Lion: How Britain Crushed the German War Machine's Dreams of Invasion in 1940 (2015), Harry N. Abrams, 
Attlee and Churchill: Allies in War, Adversaries in Peace (2020), Atlantic Books,

References

External links
Biography at The First Post
Agent biography

1962 births
Living people
Alumni of Sidney Sussex College, Cambridge
People educated at Portora Royal School
British male journalists
Daily Mail journalists
Journalists from Belfast
Labour Party (UK) councillors
Councillors in the London Borough of Islington
Male non-fiction writers from Northern Ireland